Karl Kummer may refer to:

 Karl Kummer (boxer) (1909 – ? ), Swiss boxer
 Karl Kummer (politician) (1904–1967), Austrian politician, social reformer, and labour law reformer